Badagabettu (No.80)  is a village in the southern state of Karnataka, India. It is located in the Udupi taluk of Udupi district in Karnataka.

Demographics
As of 2001 India census, Badagabettu (No.80) had a population of 6985 with 3464 males and 3521 females.

See also
 Udupi
 Parkala

References

External links
 http://Udupi.nic.in/

Villages in Udupi district